Kim Utzon (born 1957) is a Danish architect, and son of Jørn Utzon.

Biography
Kim Utzon was born in 1957 as the son of Pritzker Prize-winning Danish architect Jørn Utzon. He studied architecture at the Royal Danish Academy of Fine Arts from 1976 to 1981. From 1986 he was part of Utzon Architects. He has collaborated with his father on several projects, including the Paustian furniture store in Copenhagen.

Selected buildings
 Paustian House, Copenhagen, Denmark (1987) - with Jørn Utzon
 Henry Dunker Culture Centre, Helsingborg, Sweden (2002)
 Rosendahl Headquarters, Hørsholm, Denmark (2003)
 Harbour House I, Copenhagen, Denmark (2004)
 Bryggens Have residences, Islands Brygge, Copenhagen, Denmark (2004–06)
 Vejle Art Museum extension, Vejle, Denmark (2006)
 Utzon Center, Aalborg, Denmark (2008) - with Jørn Utzon
 Bikuben Kollegiet, Aalborg, Denmark (2009)

 Harbour House II, Copenhagen, Denmark (2010)
 Tivoli Congress Centre, Copenhagen, Denmark (2010)

Awards
 2001 Eckersberg Medal

See also
 Architecture of Denmark

References

Danish architects
1957 births
Living people
Royal Danish Academy of Fine Arts alumni